Maria Karlsson may refer to:

 Maria Karlsson (footballer, born 1983), Swedish footballer
 Maria Karlsson (footballer, born 1985), Swedish footballer